Philipomyia aprica is a species of horse fly of the family Tabanidae, subfamily Tabaninae.

Distribution
This horse fly is present in most of Europe and in the Near East (Caucasia, Turkey, Iran) .

Description
 
Their large compound eyes are bright green, without hairs and ocular bands. The terminal of antennae is brownish-black. The thorax is dark-brown and quite hairy. The abdomen has clearer bands at the end of each black tergite. Wings and legs are yellowish-brown. Halteres are brownish-yellow.

Biology
These common horse flies can be encountered in Summer in high mountain at an altitude of over 2000 meters during the daylight hours, when they mainly feed on nectar of flowers (especially of Apiaceae species). Females attack mainly horses and cattle.

References

External links
 Acta Plantarum
 Photoshelter - Natural History Images
 Evasion

Tabanidae
Insects described in 1820
Taxa named by Johann Wilhelm Meigen
Diptera of Europe